Stephen Douglas Watkins (born July 19, 1978) is an American former professional baseball player who pitched in Major League Baseball and the Chinese Professional Baseball League.

Career 
Watkins was drafted by the San Diego Padres in the 16th round of the 1998 Major League Baseball Draft and made his major league debut on August 21, 2004. In , with the Padres' Triple-A affiliate, the Portland Beavers, he went 2-5 with a 5.17 ERA and 56 strikeouts. In , he pitched for the Chinatrust Whales in Taiwan's Chinese Professional Baseball League.

External links

1978 births
American expatriate baseball players in Taiwan
Living people
Baseball players from Texas
Major League Baseball pitchers
San Diego Padres players
Fort Wayne Wizards players
Rancho Cucamonga Quakes players
Lake Elsinore Storm players
Mobile BayBears players
Portland Beavers players
Buffalo Bisons (minor league) players
New Orleans Zephyrs players
Chinatrust Whales players
Texas Tech Red Raiders baseball players
Lubbock Christian Chaparrals baseball players